The 2022–23 Bryant Bulldogs men's basketball team represented Bryant University in the 2022–23 NCAA Division I men's basketball season. The Bulldogs, led by fifth-year head coach Jared Grasso, played their home games at the Chace Athletic Center in Smithfield, Rhode Island as members of the America East Conference.

Previous season
The Bulldogs finished the 2021–22 season 22–10, 16–2 in NEC play to win the regular season championship. They defeated Central Connecticut, Mount St. Mary's, and Wagner to win the NEC tournament championship. As a result, the Bulldogs received the conference's automatic bid to the NCAA Tournament, the school's first-ever trip to the tournament, where they lost to Wright State in the First Four.

Roster

Schedule and results

|-
!colspan=12 style=| Non-conference regular season

|-
!colspan=12 style=| America East Conference regular season

|-
!colspan=12 style=| America East tournament

References

Bryant Bulldogs men's basketball seasons
Bryant Bulldogs
2022 in sports in Rhode Island
2023 in sports in Rhode Island